Annabelle Serpentine Dance is a short silent American film produced and distributed by Edison Manufacturing Company in 1895. It is one of several released by the studio the late 19th century. Each short film depicts the popular serpentine dance performed by Annabelle Moore. Many of the prints were distributed in color, which was hand-tinted.

Action in the film

The dance is performed in succession in a lockoff shot. The first is in a flowing skirt, held out by her hands with arms extended. She smiles, wearing butterfly wings on her back and the wings of Mercury in her hair. Her dance emphasizes the movement of her visible, bare legs. She kicks high, bows, and moves to her right and left. The second dancer has a voluminous, long skirt, and holds sticks in each hand attached to the skirt's outer edges. The flowing patterns of the skirt from her arm movements give the second scene a different feeling from the first.

Production and distribution
Different versions of the film were released on four different dates: August 10, 1894; February 1895; April–August 1895; and May 8, 1897. The film was directed by William K.L. Dickson and William Heise. Heise was also producer and camera operator.

Film historians have commented on the possibilities for viewers to slow down the hand cranking of the footage; it was not technically possible in other art forms.

See also
 Annabelle Butterfly Dance

References

External links

 
 

1895 films
American dance films
American silent short films
American black-and-white films
Films shot in New Jersey
Articles containing video clips
Edison Manufacturing Company films
1890s dance films
Early color films
1895 short films
1890s American films